Divine Park (foaled March 20, 2004 in Kentucky) is an American Thoroughbred racehorse who won the 2007 Withers Stakes, 2007 Westchester Handicap, and 2008 Metropolitan Handicap.

Background and Racing Career
Divine Park was sold as a yearling in 2005 at the Keeneland September Auction, where he was purchased for owner James Barry by Charles Simon, agent for $20,000.

His best wins were the won the 2007 Withers Stakes, 2007 Westchester Handicap, and 2008 Metropolitan Handicap.

He was retired 28 October 2008 to Brereton Jones' Woodburn Stud in Kentucky. His stud fee is currently $10,000.

References
 Divine Park's pedigree, stats, and auction record
 Divine Park's win in the 2008 Metropolitan Handicap at the NTRA
 Divine Park to Airdrie
 Divine Park on Stallion Register Online

2004 racehorse births
Racehorses bred in Kentucky
Racehorses trained in the United States
Thoroughbred family 1-c
American Grade 1 Stakes winners